Anja Lappalainen (12 October 1917 – 30 September 1987) was a Finnish swimmer. She competed in the women's 200 metre breaststroke at the 1936 Summer Olympics.

References

External links
 

1917 births
1987 deaths
Finnish female breaststroke swimmers
Olympic swimmers of Finland
Swimmers at the 1936 Summer Olympics
People from Kotka
Sportspeople from Kymenlaakso